This article covers the phonology of the Kerkrade dialect, a West Ripuarian language variety spoken in parts of the Kerkrade municipality in the Netherlands (including the town of Kerkrade itself) and Herzogenrath in Germany.

Just like Colognian, the Kerkrade dialect is not uniform and there are some geographical differences. This article focuses on the variety spoken in the Dutch town of Kerkrade.

Consonants
In contrast to Limburgish and Standard Dutch, but like other varieties of Ripuarian, the Kerkrade dialect was partially affected by the High German consonant shift.

  are bilabial, whereas  are labiodental.
 The voiceless plosives  are unaspirated as in Dutch and Colognian.
  is realized as a bilabial approximant  in the onset and as labio-velar  in the coda, especially after .
 Syllable-final  tends to be velarized, especially after . It can also be velarized intervocalically after .
  are velar,  is uvular, whereas  is palatal.
  occurs only intervocalically.
Intervocalically after back vowels, the sound corresponding to Limburgish  is the uvular fricative , which is the only phonological environment in which this phoneme can occur.

Vowels

  occurs only in unstressed syllables.
  is the only centering diphthong that can occur before . The functional load of the  contrast in this position is unclear.

Phonetic realization
 Among the short front unrounded vowels,  is close ,  is near-close , whereas  is mid . This also means that at least ,  and possibly also  and/or  do not have exact phonetic short counterparts, just like the open central ; in addition,  is unique among the stressable short vowels in that it can appear in the word-final position outside of function words, which makes it a free vowel like Standard Dutch .
  is a phonological back vowel like , and the two function as a long–short pair. The former is phonetically central , whereas the latter is a genuine back vowel .
 Before , all of the long vowels are pronounced even longer than in Standard Dutch. In this position, the long  are realized with a slight schwa offglide , which means that they approach the centering diphthongs , though the latter have a shorter first element (in addition to the lower starting point of ). The vowels are diphthongized and/or elongated even before intervocalic , as in  /  . This allophony does not occur before the underlying , which means that it is differentiated from  after  by the length of the preceding vowel (which is shorter before ) and the lack of diphthongization of  before , though it is unclear whether those differences are consistently maintained.

Pitch accent

As most other Ripuarian and Limburgish dialects, the Kerkrade dialect features a distinction between the thrusting tone (or ), which has a shortening effect on the syllable (not shown in transcriptions in this article) and the slurring tone. In this article, the slurring tone is transcribed as a high tone, whereas the thrusting tone is left unmarked. This is nothing more than a convention, as the phonetics of the Kerkrade pitch accent are severely under-researched. There are minimal pairs, for example  /   'wall' -  /   'carrot'.

The pitch accent can be the only difference:
 Between words differentiated only by gender, as in the minimal pair  /   -  /  
 Between the plural and singular, as in the minimal pair  /   -  /  .
 This is sometimes reinforced by other differences, e.g.  /   -  /  . Some words have two possible plural forms, one that is differentiated from the singular form only by tone and a more distinct one; compare  /   with the umlauted  /  , which are plural forms of  /  .
 Between inflected and uninflected forms of adjectives, compare  /   with  /  .
 Between the diminutive and the primitive form.

See also
 Colognian phonology

References

Bibliography

 
 
 
 
 

Germanic phonologies